Ruvuma River, formerly also known as the Rovuma River, is a river in the African Great Lakes region. During the greater part of its course, it forms the border between Tanzania and Mozambique (in Mozambique known as Rio Rovuma).

Overview

In its eastward course, the Ruvuma flows near the base of the escarpment of an arid sandstone plateau to the north, from which direction the streams, which have cut themselves deep channels in the plateau edge, have almost all short courses.

On the opposite bank the Ruvuma receives, besides the Lujenda, the Msinje River and Luchulingo River, flowing in broad valleys running from south to north. The Lujenda rises in proximity to Lake Chilwa, in the small Lake Chiuta, the swamps to the south of this being separated from Chilwa only by a narrow wooded ridge.

Lower down it varies greatly in breadth, containing in many parts long wooded islands which rise above the flood level, and are often inhabited. The river is fordable in many places in the dry season.

Bridge 

A bridge called Unity Bridge across the river between Mozambique and Tanzania was proposed as early as 1975, and although construction was started, the project was abandoned due to lack of funds. In 2002 the two national governments made a formal agreement to build a new 600 metre bridge across the river, and this was finally opened in a ceremony on 25 May 2010. The site was agreed between Presidents Machel and Nyerere because this was the site of the first entry into Mozambique by Frelimo forces in the Mozambican War of Independence on 25 September 1964. Negomano was also the location where the German forces crossed the Rovuma river on 25 November 1917. First foundation stones were laid on the Tanzanian and Mozambique sides on October 10th 2005. Construction was completed early 2010 and cost US$28 million. It used to be possible to cross the river with rafts (located at the Tanzanian side) that could carry 3 jeeps. The ferry sank in 2008 and has not been replaced. At low water the river is sometimes fordable with a good 4-wheel drive.

A smaller bridge called Unity Two was also completed in 2007 on the upper Rovuma close to Matchedge in Niassa Province.

Notes

References

 
Rivers of Mozambique
Rivers of Tanzania
Border rivers
International rivers of Africa
Mozambique–Tanzania border